Cinderford RFC is a rugby union club based in the town of Cinderford, Gloucestershire. The first team play in the third tier of the English league system following promotion as champions of National League 2 South at the end of the 2017–18 season.

Honours
 South West Division 2 West champions (2): 1990–91, 1998–99 
 London 1 v South West 1 promotion play-off winner: 2000–01
 South West Division 1 champions: 2004–05
 National Division 3 (north v south) promotion play-off winner: 2007–08
 National League 2 South champions: 2017–18

Current standings

Current squad

References

External links
 

English rugby union teams
Forest of Dean
Rugby clubs established in 1886
Rugby union in Gloucestershire